Bogo or BOGO may refer to:

 Bogø, a Danish island in the Baltic Sea
 Bogo, Cebu, a city in Cebu, Philippines
 Bogo, Cameroon, a commune in Cameroon
 Bogo people, in Eritrea
 Bogo language
 BOGO or BOGOF, an initialism for buy one, get one free, a common form of sales promotion
Bogosort, a highly inefficient sorting algorithm
 Chief Bogo, a character in the 2016 Walt Disney film Zootopia

See also
 
 Bogey (disambiguation)
 Bogus (disambiguation)

Language and nationality disambiguation pages